Denver and Rio Grande Western No. 169 is a  "Ten Wheeler" type narrow gauge steam railway locomotive. It is one of twelve similar locomotives built for the Denver and Rio Grande Railroad by Baldwin Locomotive Works in 1883. It was built as a passenger locomotive, with  drivers, the second largest drivers used on any three foot gauge D&RGW locomotive. (The K-37s which were originally standard gauge have  drivers.)

During its operational life it was used on all of the major D&RGW narrow gauge lines. It appears in two Otto Perry photographs on the branch to Santa Fe, New Mexico in April 1933. It was taken out of service in 1938 and then refurbished in 1939 to appear at the 1939 New York World's Fair.  In 1941, the railroad donated it to the City of Alamosa and it has been in Cole Park there since. It was added to the National Register of Historic Places as Denver and Rio Grande Railroad Locomotive No.169 in 2001.

See also

Rio Grande 168
Rio Grande 223
Rio Grande 278
Rio Grande 315
Rio Grande 463

References

Railway vehicles on the National Register of Historic Places in Colorado
National Register of Historic Places in Alamosa County, Colorado
Railway locomotives on the National Register of Historic Places
Buildings and structures in Alamosa, Colorado
Railway locomotives introduced in 1883
4-6-0 locomotives
Baldwin locomotives
Individual locomotives of the United States
0169
Narrow gauge steam locomotives of the United States
Tourist attractions in Alamosa County, Colorado
3 ft gauge locomotives
Preserved steam locomotives of Colorado